is a Japanese rower. He competed in the men's coxless pair event at the 1996 Summer Olympics.

References

External links
 

1967 births
Living people
Japanese male rowers
Olympic rowers of Japan
Rowers at the 1996 Summer Olympics
Sportspeople from Tochigi Prefecture
Asian Games medalists in rowing
Rowers at the 1990 Asian Games
Rowers at the 1994 Asian Games
Asian Games silver medalists for Japan
Medalists at the 1990 Asian Games
Medalists at the 1994 Asian Games
20th-century Japanese people
21st-century Japanese people